Tuquan County (Mongolian:   Tüčiuvan siyan, Тучуань шянь) is a county of Inner Mongolia, People's Republic of China, facing Jilin province to the east. It is under the administration of Hinggan League, bordering Horqin Right Middle Banner to the south and Horqin Right Front Banner to the north.

Climate

References

www.xzqh.org 

County-level divisions of Inner Mongolia